Fals or variation, may refer to:

 Fals (Arabic: فلس), a medieval copper coin
 Fals, Lot-et-Garonne, Nouvelle-Aquitaine, France; a commune
 Iwan Fals (born 1961), Indonesian musician
 Familial amyotrophic lateral sclerosis (fALS), the heritable form of Lou Gehrig's Disease, a motor neuron disease

See also

 FAL (disambiguation)
 Falls (disambiguation)